Serafino de' Serafini (1323-1393), also spelled Seraphino de' Seraphini, was an Italian painter, active in Modena in the late 14th century.

Biography
He is known by a Coronation of the Virgin and other subjects in Modena Cathedral. The Coronation bears the inscription "Seraphinus de Seraphinis pinxit 1385 die Jovis x.x.i.i.i. Marcii. Little is known of this artist, we may conclude that he was probably of some importance in his time, from the following inscription in a chapel, not named, painted by him:

The 19th-century art historians Crowe and Cavalcaselle generally dismiss the power of Seraphini, stating that in his work, the Bolognese style alternates with some Giottesque feeling. His execution is rude, his color dull and flat and coldly shadowed.

References

Sources
 

1324 births
1393 deaths
14th-century Italian painters
Italian male painters
Trecento painters
Painters from Modena